"Map of the Problematique" is a song by English alternative rock band Muse, released as the fifth single from their fourth studio album Black Holes and Revelations on 18 June 2007 as a download. The release date followed the two concerts Muse performed at Wembley Stadium on 16 and 17 June.

Composition 
"Map of the Problematique" is an electronic rock song featuring heavy use of synthesizers, distortion, flanging and octave shifting. Written in the key of C minor, it moves in common time at a moderately fast tempo of 125 bpm. Lead singer Matthew Bellamy's displayed vocal range spans from B♭3 to C5. His vocals in the song are overdubbed to create an echo effect.

The main riff does not feature any dominant chords, which gives it a more modal sound. The chords being played are C minor, E♭ major, A♭ major, and F minor.

The song has drawn frequent comparisons to "Enjoy the Silence" by Depeche Mode due to their similar chord progression and arrangement. Bellamy has also cited Depeche Mode as inspiration for the song in interviews.

The title is a reference to the book The Limits to Growth (1972) and the Club of Rome think-tank who would create a "map of the problematique" detailing the "global problematique" - a set of likely challenges the world might face in the near future.

Recording 
Originating from rehearsals before the recording of Black Holes and Revelations, "Map of the Problematique" was one of the later songs the band started work on. It was originally played on synthesisers before being transferred to guitar, giving it a darker sound, although initially the intention was to keep it as keyboard-orientated as possible. The rhythm section was recorded after the guitar tracks. This was different from anything the band had done before, according to bassist Chris Wolstenholme, "because the whole theme of the song was based more on the sound and creation of this sound".

The riff was written on keyboard; at producer Rich Costey's encouragement, Bellamy recreated it on guitar by splitting the guitar into three signals, which were processed with pitch shifters and synthesisers.

Live 
"Map of the Problematique" is one of Muse's most frequently performed songs in concert, being played at almost every show on the Black Holes and Revelations Tour, the majority of concerts on The Resistance Tour, being performed fairly often on The 2nd Law Tour and Drones World Tour. A live version was released on the HAARP album and DVD.

Track listing

Chart performance
The song reached number 18 in the UK singles chart in its first week of release, and was more successful than "Invincible", the previous single.

Charts

References

Muse (band) songs
2006 songs
2007 singles
Songs written by Matt Bellamy
Song recordings produced by Rich Costey
Warner Records singles
Rock ballads
2000s ballads